Richard Allen Murley (born August 1, 1933) is a former American football player who played for the Pittsburgh Steelers and Philadelphia Eagles of the National Football League (NFL). He played college football at Purdue University.

References

1933 births
Living people
American football tackles
Pittsburgh Steelers players
Philadelphia Eagles players
Purdue Boilermakers football players